Ossy  is a village in the administrative district of Gmina Ożarowice, within Tarnowskie Góry County, Silesian Voivodeship, in southern Poland.

The village has a population of 500.

References

Ossy